Disconnected is a 2004 studio album by the German IDM duo Funkstörung, released on Studio !K7. It is an official follow-up to the 2000 debut studio album, Appetite for Disctruction.

Critical reception
John Bush of AllMusic gave the album 2.5 stars out of 5, saying, "Unfortunately, Disconnected has only occasional glimpses of the classic Funkstörung sound, and the balance of the record devolves into the style of confessional songwriting and guitar-driven arrangements that lesser electronic acts have since performed and played out." Ron Schepper of Stylus Magazine gave the album a grade of C, saying, "Long gone is the distinctive experimental style of early Funkstörung, and in its place are faceless Soul, Pop, Funk and Rap derivations."

Track listing

References

External links
 

2004 albums
Funkstörung albums
Studio !K7 albums